The canton of Saint-Céré is an administrative division of the Lot department, southern France. Its borders were modified at the French canton reorganisation which came into effect in March 2015. Its seat is in Saint-Céré.

It consists of the following communes:
 
Autoire
Aynac
Bannes
Frayssinhes
Ladirat
Latouille-Lentillac
Leyme
Loubressac
Mayrinhac-Lentour
Molières
Saignes
Saint-Céré
Saint-Jean-Lagineste
Saint-Jean-Lespinasse
Saint-Laurent-les-Tours
Saint-Médard-de-Presque
Saint-Paul-de-Vern
Saint-Vincent-du-Pendit

References

Cantons of Lot (department)